The flat-billed kingfisher (Todiramphus recurvirostris) is a species of bird in the family Alcedinidae. It is endemic to Samoa.

Distribution
Flat-billed kingfishers are found on the islands of Upolu and Savai'i in lowland and coastal areas.   They were found not found in upland forests above 1,200m, most likely because food items become increasingly scarce with increased elevation.

Ecology
Like other species of kingfishers, the flat-billed kingfisher eats a variety of different food sources.  However, they appear to be somewhat reliant on large insects and reptiles as part of their diet.

References

Birds of Samoa
Todiramphus
Birds described in 1842
Taxonomy articles created by Polbot